Pedrinate is a village and former municipality in Switzerland.

The municipality was aggregated in the Chiasso municipality in 1975 along with Seseglio.

The village is located above Chiasso, on the Penz hill. Pedrinate is the most southern village of Switzerland. Around Pedrinate there are some vineyards.

External links
Pedrinate (Elexikon.ch)
Statistics (Tessin Canton)

Former municipalities of Ticino
Villages in the Mendrisio District